Frans Lehtonen (7 October 1859 - 27 June 1920) was a Finnish blacksmith and politician, born in Petäjävesi. He was a member of the Parliament of Finland from 1908 to 1916, representing the Social Democratic Party of Finland (SDP).

References

1859 births
1920 deaths
People from Petäjävesi
People from Vaasa Province (Grand Duchy of Finland)
Social Democratic Party of Finland politicians
Members of the Parliament of Finland (1908–09)
Members of the Parliament of Finland (1909–10)
Members of the Parliament of Finland (1910–11)
Members of the Parliament of Finland (1911–13)
Members of the Parliament of Finland (1913–16)